Vipera berus bosniensis, the Balkan cross adder or Bosnian viper, is a venomous viper subspecies endemic to the Balkan Peninsula.

Geographic range
It is only found within the Balkan Peninsula, particularly the Herzegovina region of Bosnia and Herzegovina, hence its common name.

Taxonomy
McDiarmid et al. (1999) follow Golay et al. (1993) and recognize V. b. bosniensis as a subspecies of V. berus. However, it has been considered a full species in recent literature.

References

Further reading

 Golay P, Smith HM, Broadley DG, Dixon JR, McCarthy CJ, Rage J-C, Schätti B, Toriba M. 1993. Endoglyphs and Other Major Venomous Snakes of the World. A Checklist. Geneva: Azemiops. 478 pp.

External links
 

berus|bosniensis
Reptiles described in 1889